Dumbletonius unimaculata is a species of moth of the family Hepialidae. It is endemic to New Zealand. This species is host to the vegetable caterpillar fungus Ophiocordyceps robertsii.

Taxonomy

This species was first described by John T. Salmon as Porina unimaculata in 1948 from specimens obtained by Graham Turbott on the Three Kings Islands. In 1966 Dumbleton moved the species to a new genus and gave the new combination as Trioxycanus unimaculatus.

Description

The wingspan is 51–67 mm for males and 74–90 mm for females. The colour pattern of the forewings is complex in males and usually reduced or obsolete in female. The hindwings are unicolorous yellow, orange-yellow or pink. The bright colouration of the hindwing of the male of the species fades rapidly after death.

Adults are on wing from December to April.  The larvae probably feed on fallen leaves.

Distribution
Dumbletonius unimaculatus is endemic to New Zealand and can be found only in the North Island where it is common.

Hosts 
The caterpillar of this species is a host for the vegetable caterpillar fungus Ophiocordyceps robertsii. This fungus mummifies the caterpillar then grows its fruiting body from the caterpillar's head through the soil.

References 

Moths described in 1948
Hepialidae
Moths of New Zealand
Endemic fauna of New Zealand
Endemic moths of New Zealand